The Australian Cancer Research Foundation (ACRF) is an Australian not-for-profit organisation which funds research into the prevention, diagnosis and treatment of all types of cancer. It provides multimillion-dollar grants for high-end research equipment, technologies, and infrastructure development to support the work of Australian cancer scientists.

History and structure
Established in 1984 by businessman and philanthropist, the late Sir Peter Abeles AC.

Lady (Sonia) McMahon was also a founding Board member until her death in 2010.

A Board of Trustees, composed of prominent and influential Australian business people, administers the organisation. The current chairman is Mr Tom Dery AO, Worldwide Chairman of M&C Saatchi.

A Medical Research Advisory Committee (MRAC) assesses all grant applications and advises the ACRF Board of Trustees on which research institutes will have the highest impact in cancer prevention, diagnosis and/or treatment. Membership of the MRAC is authorised by the Department of Health and Ageing with each appointment being three years. The current Chairman of the MRAC is Professor Ian Frazer, co-creator of the cervical cancer vaccine Gardasil.

Funding

The Foundation awards grants between $1.5 million and $10 million, based on scientific excellence. To date, $159.8 million has been awarded in 75 grants to 54 research institutes, universities and hospitals in every Australian state and the Australian Capital Territory, for research into all cancers. The ACRF is a privately funded charity—receives no government funding. Financial statements are publicly available on the Foundation's website.

Project funding approved

References

External links
 The Australian Cancer Research Foundation

Cancer organisations based in Australia